Sven-Erik Österberg (born 10 March 1955 in Munktorp, Västmanland, Sweden) is a Swedish official and former social-democratic politician. He is Governor of Stockholm County since 1 February 2018 and previously served as Governor of Norrbotten County from 1 October 2012 to 31 January 2018. Österberg was Minister for Financial Markets from 2004 to 2006.

Biography 
During ten years have worked first as farm worker and then as a forest worker for the Domänverket in Skinnskatteberg's territory became Österberg in 1984 local ombudsman for the Swedish Forest and Wood Workers' Union in Fagersta. At the same time, he also seemed like leisure politicians in Skinnskatteberg's Municipality with assignments as a city council and chairman of the Social Committee 1988-1991.

In 1991, he became municipal commissioner in Skinnskatteberg Municipality. In 1994, he became a member of the Parliament of Sweden. In the Riksdag, he has mainly worked with financial and labor market issues. He sat in the Committee on Finance as deputy 1996-1998, member 1998-2000. 2004 to 2006, he was Deputy Minister of Finance in the Cabinet of Göran Persson, with responsibility for municipal and financial market issues. After the Social Democrat's defeat in the 2006 election, Österberg returned to being a member of parliament. He has also been deputy in the Committee on Environment and Agriculture, Committee on Taxation and Committee on European Union Affairs, member of the Foreign Board and the War Delegation and was the chairman of the Riksdag's Nomination Committee. From 2008 to 2011, he functioned as the group leader of the Social Democratic group in parliament. From 2011 to 2012, he was a member of the Committee on the Constitution.

Within the party, Österberg has been the district chairman of the Västmanland County party district since 1995.

On 5 July 2012 Österberg was appointed governor in Norrbotten County.

On 9 November 2017 the Swedish government appointed Sven-Erik Österberg as new governor and head of the County Administrative Board in Stockholm County. He will take office on 1 February 2018. The appointment is for four years and expires on 28 February 2022.

Sven-Erik Österberg succeeds Chris Heister, whose appointment expired on 31 August 2017, after the government on 14 October withdrew the former appointment of Thomas Bodström as governor in Stockholm County.

Österberg is married and has three children.

References

External links
Sven-Erik Österberg at socialdemokraterna.se

1955 births
Living people
Governors of Stockholm County
Members of the Riksdag from the Social Democrats
Government ministers of Sweden
County governors of Sweden
Members of the Riksdag 2002–2006